The Brigada Víctor Jara is a Portuguese folk band, with a career of more than 30 years and among the most influential Portuguese folk acts.

The band was formed in 1975, by a group of young people from Coimbra that was participating in one of the massive literacy campaigns carried out by the provisional governments that administered Portugal in the years after the Carnation Revolution of 1974. The group was working in the inland region of Beira Baixa and often played Chilean and Portuguese folk and political songs for the people. After discovering the cultural and musical traditions of the region the group formed the band and named it after Víctor Jara, a Chilean socialist and folk singer-songwriter, killed after the Chilean coup of 1973 carried out by General Augusto Pinochet.

Discography
1977 - Eito Fora
1979 - Tamborileiro
1981 - Quem Sai aos Seus
1982 - Marcha dos Foliões
1984 - Contraluz
1989 - Monte Formoso
1995 - Danças e Folias
2000 - Por Sendas Montes e Vales
2003 - Ceia Louca (Single)
2006 - Ceia Louca (CD)

Band members
Arnaldo de Carvalho - percussion and chorus
Aurélio Malva - mandolin, guitar, bagpipe,"Viola Braguesa" and voice
Catarina Moura]] - voice
José Tovim - bass guitar and chorus
Joaquim Teles / Quim Né - drums and percussion
Luís Garção Nunes - guitar,  "Viola Beiroa" and "Viola Toeira" and cavaquinho
Manuel Pires da Rocha - violin and mandolin
Ricardo Dias - piano, flute, accordion and bagpipe
Rui Curto - accordion and concertina

External links
 offline 2013-02-24

Portuguese musical groups
Things named after Víctor Jara